Kaluzhsky (masculine), Kaluzhskaya (feminine), or Kaluzhskoye (neuter) may refer to:
Kaluga Oblast (Kaluzhskaya Oblast), a federal subject of Russia
Kaluzhskaya (Moscow Metro), a station of the Moscow Metro, Russia
Kaluzhskaya (closed), a temporary station of the Moscow Metro, Russia
Kaluzhskaya, former name of Oktyabrskaya, a station of the Moscow Metro, Russia
Kaluzhsky (rural locality) (Kaluzhskaya, Kaluzhskoye), name of several rural localities in Russia

See also
Kaluga (disambiguation)